Alliford Bay is a bay, and was the location of a town, on Moresby Island on Haida Gwaii. It is 15 kilometers west of Sandspit and is now a terminus for BC Ferries and North Pacific Seaplanes.

During the Second World War, the Royal Canadian Air Force flew the PBY-5 Catalina in and out of the air force base located at Alliford Bay. From 1941 to 1943, the RCAF placed its High Frequency Directing capabilities at the disposal of the Royal Canadian Navy. The station played a role in the RCN's radio intelligence operations against the Japanese. It was shut down in 1945.

Today all that is left of the base is a red cedar mill and a dry land sort. Several inhabited homes are still at Alliford Bay.

Gallery

References

Ghost towns in British Columbia
Landforms of Haida Gwaii
Unincorporated settlements in British Columbia
Bays of British Columbia
World War II sites in Canada